Einstein is a 2008 Italian television miniseries written and directed by Liliana Cavani.  The film is based on real life events of scientist Albert Einstein and it stars Vincenzo Amato in the title role.

Cast 
 Vincenzo Amato as  Albert Einstein
 Maya Sansa as  Mileva Marić
 Piotr Adamczyk as   Kurt Kluge
  Flavio Parenti as   Eduard Einstein
  Giorgio Basile as The Professor 
 Sonia Bergamasco as   Elsa Lowenthal
 Luigi Diberti as   Hermann Einstein
 Andréa Ferréol as   Pauline Kock 
  Lea Gramsdorff as   Helen Dukas
 Giorgio Lupano as   Marcel Grossmann
 Emiliano Coltorti as  Hans Albert 
 Vincent Riotta as The  NASA Operator

References

External links

2008 television films
2008 films
Italian television films
2008 biographical drama films
Italian biographical drama films
Films directed by Liliana Cavani
Biographical films about scientists
2008 drama films
2000s Italian films